Harold Ernest Theobald (18 March 1896 – 20 July 1982) was an English cricketer. Theobald was a right-handed batsman. He was born at Norwich, Norfolk, and was educated at both Bracondale School and Taunton School.

Theobald made his debut in county cricket for Norfolk against the Kent Second XI in the 1930 Minor Counties Championship. Prior to the start of World War II in 1939, he made a total of 50 appearances for the county in the Minor Counties Championship. In 1938, he made a single first-class appearance for a combined Minor Counties team against Oxford University at the University Parks. He batted twice during the match, being dismissed for 41 in the Minor Counties first-innings by Mervyn Austin, while in their second-innings he was dismissed for a duck by Edward Scott. Following the war, he resumed playing Minor counties cricket for Norfolk, making a further five appearances for the county, the last of which came against the Surrey Second XI in 1947.  During his time playing for Norfolk, he also shared in a Minor counties record first-wicket partnership with David Walker of 323.

Outside of cricket he also played football for Gloucester City, Norwich YMCA and for Norfolk.  Outside of sport, he worked as sales director for Norvic Shoe Limited.  He died at the city of his birth of 20 July 1982.

References

External links
Harold Theobald at ESPNcricinfo
Harold Theobald at CricketArchive

1896 births
1982 deaths
Cricketers from Norwich
People educated at Taunton School
English cricketers
Norfolk cricketers
Minor Counties cricketers
English footballers
Gloucester City A.F.C. players
Association footballers not categorized by position